Oxymorphazone is an opioid analgesic drug related to oxymorphone. Oxymorphazone is a potent and long acting μ-opioid agonist which binds irreversibly to the receptor, forming a covalent bond which prevents it from detaching once bound. This gives it an unusual pharmacological profile, and while oxymorphazone is only around half the potency of oxymorphone, with higher doses the analgesic effect becomes extremely long lasting, with a duration of up to 48 hours. However, tolerance to analgesia develops rapidly with repeated doses, as chronically activated opioid receptors are rapidly internalised by β-arrestins, similar to the results of non-covalent binding by repeated doses of agonists with extremely high binding affinity such as lofentanil.

See also 
 Chlornaltrexamine, an irreversible mixed μ-opioid agonist-antagonist
 Chloroxymorphamine, another irreversible μ-opioid full agonist
 Naloxazone, an irreversible μ-opioid antagonist

References 

4,5-Epoxymorphinans
Poisons
Phenols
Tertiary alcohols
Cyclohexanols
Mu-opioid receptor agonists
Semisynthetic opioids
Hydrazones
Alkylating agents
Irreversible agonists